Richmond Centre (corporately styled as CF Richmond Centre and formerly known as Richmond Square) is a shopping mall in Richmond, British Columbia, Canada. Its street address is on No. 3 Rd, but it stretches as far west as Minoru Blvd and as far south as Granville Ave. Richmond City Hall is immediately south of the mall.

History
Richmond Centre mall began as Richmond Square Shopping Centre, which was built in 1964 on part of the old Brighouse/Minoru Racetrack. Simpson Sears was located where the food court/glass atrium is located today, Zellers was located Sportchek/Old Navy area, and SuperValu occupied the south end.  

Two years later, Hudson's Bay Company announced plans for their store and mall to be built adjacent to Richmond Square. The two malls were separated by a small road (where upper parking meets the new food court is today) and acted as separate shopping centres until 1989, when they amalgamated into one large mall known today as Richmond Centre.  Sears moved to the south end of mall and a movie theatre, stores and new food court moved into space where the malls were joined & old Simpson Sears was located.

In 2012, A new $30M food court (The Dining Terrace) Opened where the former Famous Players movie theatre occupied. It features 18 different dining options. The old food court was replaced with retail space. Another retailer, Express (closed 2018) opened in the bottom floor of the former movie theatre. After its closure, Japanese retailer UNIQLO opened in its former space.

In 2019, a redevelopment proposal was approved to create 12 new mid rise buildings. The former Sears, south parkade and some parking space will be demolished for the construction of these buildings.

Layout
Richmond Centre, similar to its closest rival mall Lansdowne Centre, was mostly built on a single level owing to the abundance of unoccupied land in Richmond at the time of its construction. This means most of the shopping centre can be reached without the need of escalators or elevators. The only exception is Hudson's Bay, which has a second level, and the "Dining Terrace" food court.

The mall is laid out in a large rectangle. A galleria runs down the middle of the mall, splitting it into two parts. The north end is anchored by Hudson's Bay. The south end was anchored by sports retailer Sport Chek. 

Sears held the south end anchor but went out of business on February 28, 2015. The former Sears space, spanning  over two floors, is not currently occupied by any tenant but is used by mall management.

Stores 
Richmond Centre is managed by Cadillac Fairview. The shopping mall has 165 retail stores with their main retail anchors being Hudson’s Bay, H&M, Sport Chek, Zara, Aritzia, Sephora, Uniqlo, Lego, Lululemon, Apple, Cactus Club Café, Muji, Nike, and White Spot.

Transportation
Richmond Centre is a major transit hub for Richmond and is served by the SkyTrain system. The closest station is the Canada Line's southern terminus, Richmond–Brighouse station. The station is directly across the street from the mall's Shoppers Drug Mart / Coast Capital Savings entrance.

The mall is also served by frequent bus service along No. 3 Road. The adjacent bus exchange provides connections to other parts of Richmond as well as service to Burnaby, New Westminster, and Surrey.

Gallery

References 

Shopping malls in Metro Vancouver
Shopping malls established in 1968
Buildings and structures in Richmond, British Columbia
Ivanhoé Cambridge
Cadillac Fairview
1968 establishments in British Columbia